Robert Currie Summerhayes  (13 March 1903 — 7 June 1983) was an English first-class cricketer.

Summerhayes was born in British India at Quetta in March 1903. He was educated in England at St Lawrence College, before matriculating to Brasenose College, Oxford. After graduating from Oxford, Summerhayes returned to India. While there, he played in ten first-class cricket matches for the Europeans cricket team between 1926 and 1938, with nine of the matches coming in the Bombay Pentangular. He scored 379 runs in these matches at an average of 19.94, with two half centuries and one century; his century, a score of 109, came opening the batting against the Parsees in 1936. Summerhayes was a volunteer in the Bombay Battalion, being commissioned as a second lieutenant in April 1931. 

Summerhayes was employed by the Burmah–Shell Oil Company and was made an Officer of the Order of the British Empire in the 1946 New Year Honours. With his wife, he returned to England from Rawalpindi in the early 1950s, where he became a dairy farmer at Mayfield, Sussex. He was prosecuted and fined £10 at Lewes Magistrates Courts in March 1960, having plead guilty to selling milk to which water had been added. Summerhayes died at Mayfield in June 1983.

References

External links

1903 births
1983 deaths
People from Quetta
People educated at St Lawrence College, Ramsgate
Alumni of Brasenose College, Oxford
English cricketers
Europeans cricketers
Burmah-Castrol
Officers of the Order of the British Empire
English farmers